Major Sir George Peter Maurice FitzGerald, 5th Baronet, 23rd Knight of Kerry (27 February 1917 – 6 April 2001) was a hereditary knight and British soldier. He was the son of Sir Arthur Henry Brinsley FitzGerald and Mary Eleanor Forester. He was educated at Harrow School and at Sandhurst. He fought in the Palestine Campaign in 1939, where he was mentioned in despatches. He fought in the Second World War and was decorated with the award of Military Cross (M.C.) in 1944. He retired from the military in 1948, with the rank of Major, late of the Irish Guards.

He succeeded to the titles of 23rd Knight of Kerry and 5th Baronet of Valentia on 30 November 1967 on the death of his father, the 22nd Knight and 4th Baronet. He was succeeded by his son Adrian FitzGerald, the 24th Knight and 6th Baronet.

References

 (Ireland)

Irish knights
George
1917 births
2001 deaths
Baronets in the Baronetage of the United Kingdom
British people of Dutch-Jewish descent
British people of German-Jewish descent
Graduates of the Royal Military College, Sandhurst
People educated at Harrow School
Irish Guards officers